Alicia Silverstone (born October 4, 1976) is an American actress. She made her film debut in the thriller The Crush (1993), earning the 1994 MTV Movie Award for Best Breakthrough Performance, and gained further prominence as a teen idol when she appeared in the music video for Aerosmith's "Cryin'". She went on to star as Cher Horowitz in the teen comedy film Clueless (1995), which earned her a multi-million dollar deal with Columbia Pictures. In 1997, she starred in the big-budget superhero film Batman & Robin, playing Batgirl.

Silverstone received a Golden Globe nomination for Best Actress – Television Series Musical or Comedy for her role in the short-lived NBC series Miss Match (2003). She has continued to act in film and television and on stage.

A vegan, Silverstone has endorsed PETA activities and has published two cookbooks: The Kind Diet (2009) and The Kind Mama (2014).

Early life
Silverstone was born in San Francisco, California, the daughter of Deirdre "Didi" Silverstone (née Radford), a Scottish former Pan Am flight attendant; and Monty Silverstone, an English real estate agent. She grew up in Hillsborough, California. Her father was born to a Jewish family and her mother converted to Conservative Judaism before marriage. Silverstone had a Bat Mitzvah ceremony. She began modeling when she was six, and was subsequently cast in television commercials, the first being for Domino's Pizza. She attended Crocker Middle School, then San Mateo High School.

Career

1990s
Her first credited acting role was on The Wonder Years in 1992, in the episode "Road Test", as Kevin's high school "dream girl". Silverstone made her film debut when she obtained the leading role in the erotic thriller The Crush, playing a teenage girl who sets out to ruin an older man after he spurns her affections; she became legally emancipated at the age of 15 to work the hours required for the shooting schedule of the film. She won two awards at the 1994 MTV Movie Awards for the role—Best Breakthrough Performance and Best Villain. Silverstone made some television movies in her early career, including Torch Song, Cool and the Crazy, and Scattered Dreams.

After seeing her in The Crush, Marty Callner decided Silverstone would be perfect for a role in a music video he was directing for Aerosmith, called "Cryin'"; she was subsequently cast in two more Aerosmith videos, "Amazing" and "Crazy". These were hugely successful for both the band and Silverstone, making her a household name. After seeing Silverstone in the three videos, filmmaker Amy Heckerling decided to cast her in the coming-of-age comedy Clueless, in the role of Cher Horowitz, a sweet but spoiled girl living in Beverly Hills. Clueless became a hit and critical darling during the summer of 1995, and as a result, Silverstone signed a deal with Columbia-TriStar valued between $8 and $10 million. As part of the package, she got a three-year first-look deal for her own production company, First Kiss Productions. Silverstone also won Best Female Performance and Most Desirable Female at the 1996 MTV Movie Awards, plus awards from Blockbuster Entertainment Award, Kids' Choice Awards, National Board of Review, and an American Comedy Award for her performance in the film.

Silverstone had three other film releases in 1995—Le Nouveau monde, Hideaway and The Babysitter. The French drama about Americans Le Nouveau monde saw her play the love interest of a French boy. In the film adaptation of the novel by Dean Koontz, Hideaway, she took on the role of the daughter of a man who dies in a car accident and is revived two hours later, and the film The Babysitter was a B erotic thriller directed by Guy Ferland based on the eponymous short story by Robert Coover in his 1969 collection Pricksongs and Descants.

In 1996, she starred in the direct-to-video thriller True Crime as a Catholic school student searching for a murderer of teenage girls. Her next role was Barbara Gordon/Batgirl in Batman & Robin (1997). Budgeted at $160 million, the film grossed a modest $238 million worldwide, and her turn as Batgirl received polarized reviews from critics, who also considered the film to be one of the worst films of all time. Silverstone won a Razzie Award for Worst Supporting Actress, but received a Blimp Award at the Kid's Choice Awards for the role.

Also in 1997, the first movie by Silverstone's production company, Excess Baggage, was released. In the film, she plays a neglected young woman who stages her own kidnapping to get her father's attention, only to actually be kidnapped by a car thief. The film only grossed $14.5 million in North America, and received mediocre reviews from critics; Roger Ebert mentioned that she was "no better than OK" as he felt that she was miscast. Silverstone starred as the female lead in the romantic comedy Blast from the Past (1999), directed by Hugh Wilson and co-starring Brendan Fraser, Christopher Walken, and Sissy Spacek. Critical response towards the film was mixed, while it made a modest $40 million globally. The New York Post noted in its review that Silverstone "proves wrong anyone who gave up on her because of her ill-fated turn in the awful Batman and Robin. She's quite believable as a tough chick who's seen enough of life to give up on romance."

2000s
In the 1990s, her public profile and film career saw significant growth. For the next decade, Silverstone stepped aside from the spotlight and opted to focus on smaller-scale films and theater. In Love's Labour's Lost (2000), a film adaptation of William Shakespeare's play, directed by Kenneth Branagh, Silverstone played the Princess of France, a role which required her to sing and dance. While critical response was mixed, the film received a limited theatrical release. Film critic James Berardinelli felt that Silverstone, "while not completely at ease with all of her dialogue, is surprisingly credible" in her portrayal.

Silverstone executive produced and provided the voice of Sharon Spitz, the lead part, in the Canadian animated television Braceface, from 2001 to 2003. During this period, she played the bassist of a rock band in the independent comedy Global Heresy (2002), opposite Peter O'Toole and Joan Plowright, and made her Broadway debut alongside Kathleen Turner and Jason Biggs in a stage version of The Graduate, which ran between 2002 and 2003 at the Plymouth Theatre. Silverstone also starred as one of several disgruntled bank employees trying to rob the same bank in the small-scale comedy Scorched (2003), co-starring Rachael Leigh Cook, Woody Harrelson, and John Cleese.

Silverstone signed on to headline the 2003 NBC television series Miss Match, as Kate Fox, a Los Angeles matrimonial attorney who doubles as a high-end matchmaker. The show was cancelled after only 11 episodes had aired, and Variety in its review for the show, wrote: "It's a shame that she's stuck with such wafer-thin material here, because Silverstone is undoubtedly a fun, perky presence on the small screen." Nevertheless, she earned a Golden Globe Award nomination for Best Actress – Television Series Musical or Comedy.

In 2004, Silverstone played a news reporter turned villainess in Scooby-Doo 2: Monsters Unleashed, opposite Sarah Michelle Gellar and Freddie Prinze, Jr.. Despite a negative critical response, the film grossed $181 million at the international box office.

In the comedy Beauty Shop (2005), a spinoff of the Barbershop film franchise, Silverstone appeared with Queen Latifah, playing a naive and bubbly stylist of an Atlanta-area salon. The film was her final wide release of the decade in North America, where it grossed $37.2 million.

Her next film, the thriller Silence Becomes You, received a DVD release in 2005. Silverstone did a pilot episode in 2005 with Fox called Queen B, where she played a delusional former high school prom queen, but it was not picked up for production. In 2006, she starred in an ABC pilot called Pink Collar as a woman working in a law firm, but like Queen B, this pilot was not picked up to series.

Silverstone portrayed the close friend of a teenager turned secret agent in the action-spy film Stormbreaker (2006), directed by Geoffrey Sax and co-starring Alex Pettyfer, Ewan McGregor and Mickey Rourke. Despite a $40 million budget, the film made $23 million worldwide and was largely dismissed by critics. USA Today described Silverstone as "simply ghastly" in her role, while View London remarked that there was "strong support" from the actress. She obtained the role of a single mother returning to her hometown after a lengthy absence in the made-for-Hallmark Hall of Fame television film Candles on Bay Street, based on the book by Cathie Pelletier.

Silverstone continued her theatre work, next appearing in David Mamet's Boston Marriage (2007), a play exploring the relationship between two upper-class women, where the actress played what was described by Los Angeles Times as the "clueless and hyper-emotional Scottish maid" of one of them. The production was presented at the Geffen Playhouse theater in Los Angeles, with Variety writing that Silverstone "steals the show [in her role]. Her Scottish accent is good, her comic delivery is fresh, and she gets the maximum laugh value from each wobbly curtsey. Her character is the one thing in the show that Mamet gets absolutely right, although she is used a bit repetitively." In the same year, she starred as a secretary in the theater production Speed-the-Plow, a satire of Hollywood executives. The production, presented at Geffen Playhouse, was directed by Randall Arney and penned by David Mamet. The Hollywood Reporter concluded the play was "fueled" by "a spectacular tour de force" from Silverstone.

In 2008, Silverstone filmed another unaired ABC pilot alongside Megan Mullally called Bad Mother's Handbook and made a cameo appearance in the action-comedy Tropic Thunder. In 2009, she starred in the music video for Rob Thomas's single "Her Diamonds", and acted in Donald Margulies' production of Time Stands Still, set in Brooklyn and revolving around the relationships of two couples. Like Silverstone's previous few stage projects, it ran at the Geffen Playhouse in Los Angeles. By the late 2000s, she ventured into writing, releasing her book The Kind Diet, a guide to vegan nutrition, in 2009; she simultaneously launched its associated website The Kind Life. The Kind Diet topped the "Hardcover Advice & Misc." category of The New York Times bestseller list.

2010s
Silverstone continued to focus on theater and independent productions throughout the 2010s, but acted considerably more than in the previous decade. In 2010, she reprised her role in the Broadway production of Time Stands Still, alongside Laura Linney. Daniel Sullivan directed the play, and described Silverstone as "a breath of fresh air" which had a general positive reception among critics. The New York Times felt that Silverstone "brings warmth, actorly intelligence, and delicate humor." She filmed a small segment in the independent comedy sequel Elektra Luxx (2010), but her part was not included in the final cut of the film.

Silverstone obtained the role of the teacher of a Manhattan private-school senior in the teen romance drama The Art of Getting By (2011), which premiered at the Sundance Film Festival. The ensemble comedy Butter (2011) saw her play the adoptive mother of a 12-year-old African American girl who enters a local butter sculpturing competition in a small Iowa town. The film screened on the film festival circuit and was distributed in a limited release. She reunited with Clueless director Amy Heckerling in the independent film Vamps (2012), playing one of two vampires who fall in love and face a choice that could jeopardize their immortality. She was offered the role after Heckerling came to see her in Time Stands Still. Despite a very limited release, Variety found the film to be "a refreshing change of pace [...] with an irresistible cast".

Silverstone guest-starred in Childrens Hospital (2011) and obtained a four-episode role in the first season of Suburgatory (2012), reuniting with her Clueless castmate Jeremy Sisto. In 2012, Silverstone returned to Broadway in the production of The Performers, a comedic performance set at the Adult Film Award in Las Vegas. The play premiered in November at the Longacre Theatre, but was cancelled after 23 previews and seven regular performances due to the aftermath of Hurricane Sandy. In 2013, she filmed the television pilot HR, which was not picked up, and appeared in the Sundance comedy Ass Backwards, released for VOD and selected theaters. In 2014, Silverstone took on the role of a self-absorbed mother in the rural environment in the coming-of-age drama Angels in Stardust, and her Kind Life follow-up book, The Kind Mama, was published.

In 2015, Silverstone starred in the New York production of Of Good Stock, a play revolving around a group of siblings who gather at their family home for a summer weekend. Entertainment Weekly remarked that she was "magnetic even as an engaged narcissist, ditzy" sister, however The New York Times felt that her role was "the most cartoonish of the characters and a thankless part for [Silverstone], who tips into comic shrillness here". She appeared in the romantic comedy Who Gets the Dog? (2016), opposite Ryan Kwanten portraying a divorcing couple fighting over custody of their beloved dog. The production went straight-to-DVD. Her next film appearance was in the independent biographical drama King Cobra (2016), as the mother of gay film actor Brent Corrigan.

In 2016's Catfight, Silverstone played the love interest of an outsider artist having a bitter lifetime rivalry with a wealthy housewife. The black comedy was released for VOD and selected theaters, to largely positive reviews. Silverstone starred in three 2017 films — Diary of a Wimpy Kid: The Long Haul, The Killing of a Sacred Deer, and The Tribes of Palos Verdes — and filmed the television series American Woman in July of that year. On her busy workload, she remarked: "[T]hey were all happening at the same time. Everybody worked together. Yorgos [the Sacred Dee director] helped us to push my date and Diary of a Wimpy Kid held the movie for a week or two for me". The comedy The Long Haul, the fourth film in the Diary of a Wimpy Kid film series, saw her portray the clueless and loving mother of the titular character. The film was panned by critics for the recasting of the main characters and its story development, and while The Long Haul made a modest $40.1 million worldwide, it emerged as Silverstone's most widely seen film since Beauty Shop (2005).

In the psychological thriller The Killing of a Sacred Deer, directed by Yorgos Lanthimos and co-starring Colin Farrell and Nicole Kidman, Silverstone took on the role of a widow and the mother of a mysterious boy who befriends his late father's cardiac surgeon. The film competed for the Palme d'Or at the 70th Cannes Film Festival and was an arthouse success. Casting director Francine Maisler chose Silverstone after seeing her star in a previous play; her two-scene appearance was filmed in one day, and she remarked of the filming: "[I]t was just so wonderful. When you admire something so much, it's a little bit hard to imagine how you fit into it". In the independent coming-of-age drama The Tribes of Palos Verdes, she reunited with her Butter co-star Jennifer Garner, playing a real-estate agent living in Palos Verdes, an affluent, coastal suburb of Los Angeles. The film received a one-theater release by IFC.

Silverstone appeared in the comedy Book Club (2018), opposite Diane Keaton, Jane Fonda and Candice Bergen, playing the "domineering" daughter of a "skittish" widow reading Fifty Shades of Grey. The series American Woman, starred Silverstone as a woman discovering her own brand of independence amid the rise of second-wave feminism in the 1970s. It aired for one season on the Paramount Network. To promote the series, she appeared on an episode of Lip Sync Battle with co-star Mena Suvari. She appeared in the horror film The Lodge, which premiered at the 2019 Sundance Film Festival.

2020s
In 2020, Silverstone appeared in the comedies Bad Therapy, Sister of the Groom and Valley Girl, and also narrated the eco-superhero fantasy novel CHENDELL: A Natural Warrior and the Audible podcast Eat S-t Kenny Daniels. She began starring in the Netflix series The Baby-Sitters Club.

In 2021, she appeared in the Netflix series Masters of the Universe: Revelation.

Her upcoming roles include the crime drama Reptile co-starring Benicio del Toro and Justin Timberlake.

Activism
Silverstone is an animal rights and environmental activist. She became a vegan in 1998 after attending an animal rights meeting, saying, "I realized that I was the problem ... I was an animal lover who was eating animals." She has stated she struggled with childhood vegetarianism: "At eight years old it's hard to stick to your guns – and so through the years I was always starting and stopping trying to be a vegetarian." She has been criticised due to her anti-vaccine stance, promotion of pseudoscientific diet and lifestyle choices, and her hyperbolic claims regarding the medical and spiritual benefits of veganism.

In 2004, Silverstone was voted "Sexiest Female Vegetarian" by PETA. In 2007, she appeared nude in a print advertisement and 30-second commercial for PETA championing vegetarianism; the TV spot was subsequently pulled from the Houston, Texas market by Comcast Cable. In 2016, she posed nude in one of the group's "I'd Rather Go Naked" anti-wool ads. She has set up a sanctuary for rescued pets in Los Angeles. In 2012, during the trial of Russian band Pussy Riot, she wrote a letter to Vladimir Putin asking that vegan meals be made available to all Russian prisoners.

Federal campaign contribution records list Silverstone contributing $500 to Dennis Kucinich's 2004 presidential campaign. She supported Barack Obama's presidential candidacy, and endorsed Senator Bernie Sanders for president in the 2016 U.S. presidential election.

In 2009, she appeared in "A Gaythering Storm", a Funny or Die spoof Internet video parodying anti-same-sex marriage commercial "Gathering Storm".

Personal life
Silverstone has two older siblings: a half-sister from her father's previous marriage, Kezi Silverstone; and a brother, David Silverstone.

She married her longtime boyfriend, rock musician Christopher Jarecki, in a beachfront ceremony at Lake Tahoe on June 11, 2005. After meeting outside a movie theater in 1997, they dated for eight years prior to their marriage. They got engaged about a year before their marriage, and Jarecki presented Silverstone with an engagement ring that had belonged to his grandmother.

They lived in an eco-friendly Los Angeles house, with solar panels and an organic vegetable garden. Silverstone had bought the house, shared with a "menagerie of rescued dogs", in 1996.

On May 5, 2011, Silverstone gave birth to a son. In March 2012, she received media attention for uploading a video of herself feeding chewed food to her son from her own mouth.

Jarecki and Silverstone separated in February 2018. In May 2018 she filed for divorce, and it was finalized in November 2018.

Filmography

Film

Television

Music videos

Stage credits

Awards and nominations
She was awarded a Heart Of Green Award in 2009, which "recognizes individuals, organizations or companies who have helped green go mainstream." In 2010, she was awarded a Voice Of Compassion Award by the Physician's Committee For Responsible Medicine for "shining a spotlight on the powerful health benefits of a vegan diet." In 2021, she was nominated for the Daytime Emmy Award for Outstanding Limited Performance in a Children's Program

See also
 List of animal rights advocates

References

External links

 The Kind Life with Alicia Silverstone Silverstone's website, an interactive extension of her book, The Kind Diet
 
 
 

1976 births
Living people
20th-century American actresses
21st-century American actresses
21st-century American Jews
Actresses from San Francisco
Activists from California
American child actresses
American environmentalists
American women environmentalists
American female models
American film actresses
American people of English-Jewish descent
American people of Scottish descent
American animal rights activists
American stage actresses
American television actresses
American voice actresses
American veganism activists
Jewish American actresses
People from Hillsborough, California
Vegan cookbook writers